Stay Woke: The Black Lives Matter Movement is a 2016 American television documentary film starring Jesse Williams about the Black Lives Matter movement, and the events that led to the uprising of the movement. The phrase "stay woke" refers to a continuing awareness of issues concerning social justice and racial justice and came to widespread use as a result of Black Lives Matter. The "Stay Woke" documentary gives a deeper understanding to how the movement came to be and what the movement believes.

The film debuted on BET on May 26, 2016.

Summary 
The film opens up with sharing the voice recording of the night that Trayvon Martin was killed by George Zimmerman. The documentary shows how the #blacklivesmatter hashtag came into effect on social media and how the movement rose up. In the documentary, other incidents where injustice was shown is displayed throughout the film. The "Stay Woke" documentary shows the cry for justice as a result of several instances of police brutality. "Stay Woke" digs deep into the movement of Black Lives Matter and everything that this movement represents.

Black Lives Matter 
The Black Lives Matter movement started in 2013 after the uproar over the killing of Michael Brown in Ferguson, MO. The movement started out with the goal of connecting African-Americans who share a similar battle with racism and injustice. Black Lives Matter frequently holds protests centered around issues such as police brutality, racial inequality, and racial profiling.

References

External links

Stay Woke: The Black Lives Matter Movement on Bet

2016 documentary films
2016 television films
2016 films
Documentary films about racism in the United States
Documentary films about African Americans
American documentary television films
Black Lives Matter art
BET original programming
2010s English-language films
2010s American films